The 1955 Occidental Tigers football team represented Occidental College in the Southern California Intercollegiate Athletic Conference (SCIAC) during the 1955 college football season.  In their 11th season under head coach Roy Dennis, the Tigers compiled a 6–2 record (2–2 against SCIAC opponents) and outscored opponents by a total of 141 to 69. The team played its home games at Patterson Field in Los Angeles.

Two Occidental players were selected as first-team players on the 1955 All-SCIAC team: junior end Jim Mora and senior fullback Don Lyon. Three others were named to the second team: junior quarterback Jack Kemp, junior tackle Ron Botchan, and senior guard Manuel Murietta. Lyon led the SCIAC in rushing with 478 yards; Mora led the league in receiving with 19 catches for 319 yards; Kemp led the league with 70.1 passing yards per game.

Three members of Occidental's 1955 team went on to play professional football: Jack Kemp; Jim Mora; and Ron Botchan.

Schedule

References

Occidental
Occidental Tigers football seasons
Occidental Tigers football